The District of Grevenmacher (1843 – 3 Oct 2015) was one of three districts of Luxembourg. It contained three cantons divided into 25 communes:

Echternach
Beaufort
Bech
Berdorf
Consdorf
Echternach
Rosport-Mompach
Waldbillig
Grevenmacher
Betzdorf
Biwer
Flaxweiler
Grevenmacher
Junglinster
Manternach
Mertert
Wormeldange
Remich
Bous
Burmerange
Dalheim
Lenningen
Mondorf-les-Bains
Remerschen
Remich
Stadtbredimus
Waldbredimus
Wellenstein

It bordered the districts of Luxembourg to the west and Diekirch to the north, the German Länder of Rhineland-Palatinate and Saarland to the east, and the French département of Moselle, Grand Est to the south. It had a per capita income of $57,800.

After the reorganization of Luxembourg's administrative divisions in 2015, all three districts were abolished per 3 October 2015.

External links

http://www.communes.lu/ - Features a map of the communes of Luxembourg

 
Districts of Luxembourg